Roger Williams University School of Law is the law school of Roger Williams University, a private university in Bristol, Rhode Island.  It is the only law school in Rhode Island. It was the first graduate degree program established by the university, then Roger Williams College, in 1993. The School of Law has been accredited by the American Bar Association since 1997 and has been a member of the Association of American Law Schools since 2006.

According to Roger Williams's official 2014 ABA-required disclosures, 46.2% of the Class of 2014 obtained full-time, long-term, JD-required employment nine months after graduation, excluding solo-practitioners.

Enrollment and facilities
The school enrolls approximately 370 students and has a student to faculty ratio of around 13:1. The law library contains approximately 280,000 volumes.

Academics
Roger Williams University School of Law offers two degrees:  the standard American law school professional degree, Juris Doctor (JD), as well as a Master of Studies in Law (MSL) degree.  In addition, Roger Williams University offers numerous joint degree programs. The JD/Master of Science in criminal justice is designed to prepare graduates to formulate system policy and serve effectively as administrators to United States justice system agencies.  The School of Law offers two joint-degree programs in conjunction with the University of Rhode Island: a JD/Master of Marine Affairs program is geared toward students interested in maritime, admiralty, and environmental law, and the joint JD/Master of Science in labor relations and human resources program is designed for students interested in issues relating to employment and labor relations. In addition the School of Law offers a JD/Master of Science in historical preservation and a JD/Master of Science in cyber security (to be introduced fall 2016).

Employment 
According to Roger Williams's official 2013 ABA-required disclosures, 46.2% of the Class of 2014 obtained full-time, long-term, JD-required employment nine months after graduation, excluding solo-practitioners. Roger Williams's Law School Transparency under-employment score is 24.6%, indicating the percentage of the Class of 2015 unemployed, pursuing an additional degree, or working in a non-professional, short-term, or part-time job nine months after graduation.

Costs
The total cost of attendance (indicating the cost of tuition, fees, and living expenses) at Roger Williams for the 2018–2019 academic year is $35,735. The Law School Transparency estimated debt-financed cost of attendance for three years is $107,205.

Scholarships of half to full tuition are awarded to students selected for the Honors Program. The Admissions Committee selects students, evaluating them on their academic records, LSAT scores, and recommendations.

Clinics and student organizations
The Marine Affairs Institute explores the legal, economic, and policy issues raised by the development of the oceans and coastal zone. Students take elective courses in traditional admiralty law and practice, pollution and environmental regulation, coastal zoning, fisheries, and the international law of the sea. The Honors Program is a three-year program of seminars, clinics, and externships. The School of Law operates a Criminal Defense Clinic, an Immigration Clinic, and the Business Start-Up Clinic in Providence. Students may also engage in a semester-long supervised clerkship in a judge's chambers or in a public interest or governmental law office for academic credit. The multicultural mentor program pairs students of color with members of the bench and bar.

Other student organizations include The Association for Public Interest Law, Maritime Law Society, Women's Law Association, the Alliance (LGBT), and the Multicultural Law Student Association.

Ralph Papitto controversy
In July 2007 the school made national headlines in the wake of a racist statement made by university trustee Ralph Papitto, for whom the law school was then named, at a Roger Williams board meeting.  After students protested and submitted a petition to the administration, on July 18, 2007, Papitto requested that his name be removed from the school. Papitto resigned as chairman from the board and was granted the title "Chairman Emeritus". He was succeeded as chairman by Richard Bready, the CEO of Nortek Inc., the company Papitto founded.

Sources

External links
 Official website

1993 establishments in Rhode Island
Buildings and structures in Bristol, Rhode Island
Education in Bristol County, Rhode Island
Educational institutions established in 1993
Private universities and colleges in Rhode Island
Roger Williams University School of Law
Law schools in Rhode Island